Raviryal is a village in Rangareddy district in Telangana, India. It falls under Maheshwaram mandal. A semiconductor hub FAB City (fabrication facility) is located in Raviryal village.

Schools
Raviryal is home to  campus international school, Aga Khan Academy.

References

Villages in Ranga Reddy district